Marion Potts is an Australian theatre director.

At the University of Sydney, she joined the Sydney University Dramatic Society and contemplated a career in theatre after studying theatre symbiotics with an inspiring female academic. She studied directing at the National Institute of Dramatic Art.

She has directed productions for many of Australia's major theatre companies including Sydney Theatre Company, Melbourne Theatre Company, Queensland Theatre Company, Malthouse Theatre, State Theatre Company of South Australia, Griffin Theatre Company, Bell Shakespeare and Victorian Opera.

Potts was a Resident Director for the Sydney Theatre Company from 1995 to 1999. She was Bell Shakespeare’s Associate Artistic Director and Artistic Director of its development arm, Mind’s Eye, from 2005 to 2010. She was Artistic Director of the Malthouse Theatre in Melbourne from 2010 to 2015. She became Director of Theatre with the Australia Council in 2015.

Potts received the Helpmann Award for Best Direction of a Play in 2006 for her production The Goat, or Who is Sylvia? with the State Theatre Company of South Australia.

References

Australian theatre directors
Living people
Women theatre directors
Helpmann Award winners
Year of birth missing (living people)